Raggamuffin Vol 1 is a New Zealand and Australian compilation album released to coincide with the Raggamuffin Music Festival in 2008. It was sold on the day in Australia, and is available throughout retailers in New Zealand and online.

Track listing 

 'Here I Am (Come and Take Me)' - 4:02 - UB40
 'Love Letter' - 3:34 - Katchafire
 'Turn It Around' - 4:31 - The Black Seeds
 'Keep Rising' - 4:46 - House of Shem
 'True Progress' - 6:06 - The Midnights (Feat. Tuffy Culture)
 'Lively Up Yourself' - 9:00 - The Wailers
 'Close To You' - 5:29 - Maxi Priest
 'Mr Wendal' - 4:06 - Arrested Development
 'People Everyday' - 4:57 - Arrested Development
 'Wild World' - 3:34 - Maxi Priest
 'Cobra Style (Disco Mix)' - 6:00 - Aston 'Familyman' Barrett Of The Wailers
 'Outside Looking In' - 6:13 - The Midnights
 'I Love You Girl' - 3:39 - House Of Shem
 'Cool Me Down' - 4:54 - The Black Seeds
 'Say What You're Thinking' - 4:55 - Katchafire
 'Kiss & Say Goodbye' - 3:11 - UB40

Charting Positions

References

2008 compilation albums
Reggae compilation albums